Cwmffrwdoer Halt railway station served the suburb of Pontnewynydd, in the historical county of Monmouthshire, Wales, from 1912 to 1941 on the Pontypool and Blaenavon Railway.

History 
The station was opened on 13 July 1912 by the London and North Western Railway and the Great Western Railway. It closed on 5 May 1941.

References 

Disused railway stations in Monmouthshire
Railway stations in Great Britain opened in 1912
Railway stations in Great Britain closed in 1941
Former London and North Western Railway stations
Former Great Western Railway stations
1912 establishments in Wales
1941 disestablishments in Wales